Aleksandar Trišović (Serbian Cyrillic: Александар Тришовић; born 25 November 1983) is a Serbian former footballer.

Playing career
Trišović started playing football with his hometown team FK Sloga Kraljevo, before transferring to FK Mačva Šabac. At the age of 16 he was on the move again, this time to OFK Beograd.

OFK Beograd
Shortly before his 18th birthday, Trišović cracked OFK's first team. During his debut season in the club's top squad, 2001/02, he appeared in 14 league matches.

He soon developed into a dependable left midfielder capable of delivering a quality cross. In the next season, he appeared in 21 league matches.

His final season at OFK, 2003–04 turned out to be a disappointment with only 4 league appearances. In 2004, he was sold to Ukrainian Vyshcha Liha club FC Volyn Lutsk.

Volyn Lutsk
His single season with Volyn turned out to be very successful with 7 goals from 28 league appearances. That led to a transfer to another Ukrainian club FC Kryvbas Kryvyi Rih.

Kryvbas
While playing for Kryvbas, he received a call from Javier Clemente to represent Serbia in its first inaugural match as a new independent country and national team. Serbia was facing the Czech Republic and eventually won by the score of 3–1. Trišović scored a goal on his debut and at the same time caught the eye of Serbian giants Red Star.

Red Star Belgrade
A move to Red Star followed shortly after in August 2006. However, Trišović's season and a half for the Belgrade club largely proved to be a disappointment.

He was getting playing time with 21 league appearances in the 2006–07 season while the club was coached by Dušan Bajević, but when he walked out in March 2007, Trišović lost his first team place under new head coach Boško Đurovski.

The next season 2007–08 saw him make only 4 league appearances before being transferred back to Ukraine in January 2008, this time to FC Metalist Kharkiv.

Metalist Kharkiv
After moving to Kharkiv during the 2007–08 winter transfer window Trišović played 7 matches in the second half of the Ukrainian season. In the first half of the following, 2008–09, season he played 14 league matches and scored 1 goal. In February 2009 he was loaned out to another Vyshcha Liha club Chornomorets Odesa for the remainder of that season. In his debut league game for Chornomorets on 1 March, he earned a red card, as the team lost 0–3 to Karpaty Lviv. In the summer of 2009 he was loaned out to another Vyshcha Liha club Zakarpattia Uzhhorod, where he was one of the key players. He returned to Metalist at the end of his loan and played for one league match against Kryvbas in the 2010–11 season.

References

External links
 
 
 

1983 births
Living people
Serbia and Montenegro footballers
Serbian footballers
Serbia international footballers
Serbia and Montenegro expatriate footballers
Serbian expatriate footballers
OFK Beograd players
Red Star Belgrade footballers
Serbian SuperLiga players
FC Metalist Kharkiv players
FC Kryvbas Kryvyi Rih players
FC Chornomorets Odesa players
FC Volyn Lutsk players
FC Hoverla Uzhhorod players
FK Radnički Niš players
Ukrainian Premier League players
Ukrainian First League players
Sportspeople from Kraljevo
Expatriate footballers in Ukraine
Serbia and Montenegro expatriate sportspeople in Ukraine
Serbian expatriate sportspeople in Ukraine
Association football midfielders